Repulse Bay Beach is a gazetted beach located in Repulse Bay, Southern District, Hong Kong. The beach has barbecue pits and is managed by the Leisure and Cultural Services Department of the Hong Kong Government. Rated Grade 1 by the Environmental Protection Department for its water quality, the beach is about 292 metres long with views of Middle Island. There is an adjacent shrine (Kwun Yam Shrine) and shopping centre (The Pulse).

History
On 1 July 1999, Sau-kwan, a 14-year-old schoolboy, drowned while swimming near the beach. He was rescued by lifeguards and was taken by an ambulance to Tang Shiu Kin Hospital where he was pronounced dead.

On 22 June 2004, a 27-year-old man drowned while swimming with friends near the beach. He was rescued by lifeguards and taken to Ruttonjee Hospital, where he was pronounced dead.

Usage
The beach is one of the longest beaches in Hong Kong with a length of 292 metres (960 feet) and is capable of accommodating tens of thousands of sun-hungry bodies. It is consistently among the most popular beaches in Hong Kong, attracting large tour groups throughout the year.

Features
The beach has the following features:
 BBQ pits (24 nos.)
 Changing rooms
 Showers
 Toilets
 Fast food kiosk
 Restaurant
 Water sports centre
 Playground
 Beach volleyball court

See also
 Beaches of Hong Kong

References

External links 

 Official website

Repulse Bay
Beaches of Hong Kong